The Jonathan Noble House, also known as the Reiner Log House, is a historic house in Columbus, Ohio, United States. The house was built c. 1830 and was listed on the National Register of Historic Places in 1975. In 1975, it was the only known log house left in Blendon Township.

The house was originally hand-made with logs, with half-dovetail notching, and is estimated to have been built between 1825 and 1835. Many alterations were made over time, most of which appear to date to around 1915, but leaving the log structure sound.

See also
 National Register of Historic Places listings in Columbus, Ohio

References

Log houses in the United States
Houses completed in 1830
National Register of Historic Places in Columbus, Ohio
Houses in Columbus, Ohio
Houses on the National Register of Historic Places in Ohio